Kabwoya is a village in the Kikuube District of the Western Region of Uganda.

Location
The coordinates of Kabwoya are 1°14'43.0"N, 31°04'59.0"E (Latitude:1.245278; Longitude:31.083056).

Overview
The  Kigumba–Masindi–Hoima–Kabwoya Road joins the  Kyenjojo–Kabwoya Road in the middle of Kabwoya.

See also
List of roads in Uganda
List of cities and towns in Uganda

References

External links
  Works ministry needs Shs130 billion for road projects in Bunyoro

Populated places in Western Region, Uganda
Cities in the Great Rift Valley
Hoima District